Maduranthakam Lake or Maduranthakam aeri, is a lake spread over 2400 acres in Maduranthakam, Chengalpattu district, Tamil Nadu, India.

Geography 
Maduranthakam aeri is an artificial lake and is the largest lake in the district of Chengalpattu and second largest lake in the state of Tamil Nadu.

See also
Water management in Chennai

References

Lakes of Chennai
Lakes of Tamil Nadu